Andrej Fišan (born 8 January 1985) is a Slovak football goalkeeper who currently plays for Fortuna Liga club MFK Skalica.

Career
He played for FK Senica five Corgoň Liga matches.

External links
Corgoň Liga profile

Eurofotbal profile

References

1985 births
Living people
Slovak footballers
Association football goalkeepers
FK Senica players
Spartak Myjava players
FC DAC 1904 Dunajská Streda players
MFK Skalica players
Slovak Super Liga players
Expatriate footballers in the Czech Republic
FC Silon Táborsko players
Sportspeople from Brezno